Triclonella sequella is a moth in the family Cosmopterigidae. It is found in Panama and Colombia.

References

Natural History Museum Lepidoptera generic names catalog

Cosmopteriginae
Moths of Central America
Moths of South America
Moths described in 1914